Archibald Simpson (4 May 1790 – 23 March 1847) was a Scottish architect, who along with his rival John Smith, is regarded as having fashioned the character of Aberdeen as "The Granite City".

Life and work

Early life
Archibald Simpson was born at 15 Guestrow, Aberdeen on 4 May 1790, the ninth and last child of William Simpson (1740–1804), a clothier at Broadgate, and his wife Barbara Dauney (c.1750 - 1801), the daughter of a Presbyterian minister. The family house at Guestrow is thought to have been built by his uncle William Dauney, who was a master mason. The house was later demolished in 1930.

Simpson attended Aberdeen Grammar School as a contemporary of Byron, who lived nearby in Broadgate. At 13 he entered Marischal College but left after a year, on the death of his father, to work in the office of James Massie, a builder at Castlehill, having been influenced so by his uncle William Dauney.

Due to being born lame in his left arm, his father left him a legacy of £200 with which at the age of 20 he went to London to be apprenticed to architect Robert Lugar and later David Laing. After two years Simpson left to embark on a study tour of Italy, returning to Aberdeen in 1813 to start an architectural practice in his old house at 15 Guestrow.

Architectural practice

Simpson first established his practice in 1813 at his old childhood home at 15 Guestrow. He later moved to premises at 130 Union Street, where in 1826 he lost his entire archive of drawings in a fire which destroyed the building, forcing him to move his office to 8 Belmont Street and later to 22 Crown Street - where the former Post Office building now stands - before later moving to live at 15 Bon Accord Street and practicing from his office at 1 Bon Accord Street.

Simpson began his work at a time when wealthy country landowners were very influential in the social and cultural development of the City of Aberdeen, church and institutional expansion was rife and the enterprising Incorporated Trades were looking to invest heavily and speculatively in the new civic development - made possible by the bold construction of Union Street westwards across the Denburn towards the rich hinterland in 1801.

Simpson, along with his brother Alexander, was responsible for reviving the Aberdeen Musical Society, founded in 1747, in a move to make influential social contacts which were vital to the success of his architectural practice. Archibald played the violin and his brother Alexander played the flute. He later also founded the Aberdeen Artists Society with his friend and collaborator, the artist James Giles, who also undertook several portraits of Simpson for the University Court.

James Matthews was articled to Simpson in 1834.

Architectural style

The boldest and most refined architecture of Simpson is in the Grecian style, in its classic purity of detail and proportion, although he was equally at ease in adopting Gothic, Italian Renaissance, Tudor and Hanseatic architectural styles to meet the preference of his clients or the nature of the site. Clients frequently placed him in open competition with John Smith, though they greatly respected one another's work and ambition to achieve civic unity in the new streets that were then under construction. The result was a fine granite street architecture that was to influence the quality of development for a further century.

Death and legacy

Simpson died, aged 56, at his house at 1 East Craibstone Street, Aberdeen on 23 March 1847, having returned ill from a business trip to Derby.
He is buried in the graveyard of the Kirk of St Nicholas on Union Street. The grave lies to the south of the church. The Aberdeen Civic Society erected a granite memorial to him in the gardens of Bon Accord Square, as part of the European Architectural Heritage Year in 1975.

The city has a Wetherspoons pub located on the corner connecting Union Street to King Street to honour his memory.

Works
Works include:
 1811 Designs his first building in Aberdeen, Union Chambers, while still in London, for the Duchess of Gordon.
 1815 Druminnor House (Additions)
 1815 Castle Forbes
 1815 Morison of Auchintoul's House, plans prepared while with Robert Lugar
 1817 St. Andrew's Chapel, now St. Andrew's Cathedral
 1818 Kintore Parish Church and Manse, for his uncle, the Rev. John Shand
 1819 Lunatic Asylum
 1820 Medico-Chirurgical Building
 1820 Assembly Rooms (Music Hall)
 1822 Gordon Castle Chapel
 1822 Boath House, Nairnshire
 1822 Park House
 1822 Heathcote House
 1822 Haddo House (Additions), for the Earl of Aberdeen
 1822 Huntly Lodge (Alterations), for the Duchess of Gordon
 1823 Athenaeum
 1823 Bon-Accord Terrace, Square and Crescent, for the Tailor Incorporation
 1824 Durris House (Additions)
 1827 Pitlurg House, for General Gordon Cumming, Skene
 1827 Tillery House
 1827 Letham Grange, Angus
 1827 Morkeu House
 1827 School in Edinburgh
 1827 Skene House (Additions)
 1827 Stracathro House, Angus, for Alex Cruickshank
 1828 St Giles' Church, Elgin
 1829 Masonic Halls and Assembly Rooms, Forres
 1830 Woodside Free Church
 1830 Anderson Institution, Elgin
 1830 Plan for the development of Ferryhill, for the Shoemaker Incorporation. Part of Marine Terrace executed before he died.
 1831 Castle Newe (Now Demolished)
 1831 Plan for the development of the West End (Not executed)
 1831 Plan for the opening-up of the Guestrow area – centring the spire of St.Nicholas with the old entry to Marischal College.
 1831 Wooden bridge over the Spey at Fochabers, for the Duke of Gordon
 1832 Craig Castle (Additions)
 1832 Royal Infirmary
 1833 St. Andrew's Episcopal Church, Banff
 1835 East Church of St. Nicholas (Not the tower)
 1835 Episcopal Church, Fochabers, for the Duchess of Gordon
 1835 Murtle House
 1835 Dr. Bell's School, Frederick Street
 1836 Drumoak Parish Church
 1839 Westburn House, Aberdeen
 1840 Mrs Emslie's Institution (Girl's High School)
 1840 Crimonmogate House for merchant Patrick Milne
 1840 Lessendrum House (Destroyed by fire)
 1840 Meldrum House (Additions)
 1840 Gordon Schools, Huntly, for the Duchess of Gordon
 1840 Glassaugh House
 1840 Pittodrie House (Additions)
 1840 28 Albyn Place, Aberdeen
 1840 Carnoustie House (Demolished)
 1840 North of Scotland Bank, Huntly
 1842 New Market and Market Street layout, for the New Market Co. (Demolished)
 1843 Post Office, Market Street
 1844 North of Scotland Bank (Head Office), now a pub owned by J D Wetherspoon called the Archibald Simpson
 1844 Marischal College
 1844 Three Free Churches (The Triple Kirks)
 1844 Free Church, Rothesay
 1844-5 Projected Railway Scheme
 1845 Lunatic Asylum (Extension)
 1846 Mechanics Institute
 1846 Union Bank, Lerwick (His last work?)
 1846 Big Street Improvement Scheme

References

1790 births
1847 deaths
19th-century Scottish architects
Alumni of the University of Aberdeen
British neoclassical architects
Gothic Revival architects
Greek Revival architects
Architects from Aberdeen